The 1972 New South Wales Rugby Football League premiership was the 65th season of Sydney's professional rugby league football competition, Australia's first. Twelve teams, including six of 1908's foundation clubs and another six from across Sydney, competed for the J. J. Giltinan Shield during the season, which culminated in a grand final match between the Manly-Warringah and Eastern Suburbs clubs.

Season summary
The 1972 season's Rothmans Medal winner was Western Suburbs' halfback Tommy Raudonikis. Rugby League Week awarded their player of the year award to Eastern Suburbs' five-eighth John Ballesty.

This season, for the first time since 1966, Souths would fail to reach the grand final, and for the first time since 1948 the Grand Final did not feature either Souths or St George.

Following the grand final, several players travelled to France to represent Australia in the 1972 Rugby League World Cup.

Teams

Regular season

Bold – Home game
X – Bye
Opponent for round listed above margin

Ladder

Ladder progression

Numbers highlighted in green indicate that the team finished the round inside the top 4.
Numbers highlighted in blue indicates the team finished first on the ladder in that round.
Numbers highlighted in red indicates the team finished last place on the ladder in that round.

Finals

Grand final

After twenty-five years in the competition and five Grand Final losses, Manly finally broke through to win the club's first NSWRFL premiership.

In a controversial match, the Sea-Eagles downed the Eastern Suburbs Roosters 19 to 14, thus shedding their 'bridesmaids' tag. The Roosters were highly critical of referee Keith Page after the match, claiming both of Manly's tries shouldn't have been awarded. To add to their rage, Easts crossed for two tries that were disallowed.

A dour first half saw the teams go to the break tied 4–4, before a try by hooker Fred Jones put Manly ahead. Jones appeared to drop the ball as he attempted to ground it, but was awarded a try nonetheless. For his part Jones contends that he did place the ball with downward pressure. Midway through the second half, controversy flared again when Manly centre Ray Branighan appeared to stop over the Eastern Suburbs try line after accepting what looked like a forward pass from prop Bill Hamilton. However, referee Page allowed it and the Manly fans began celebrating, knowing that at 19–4 their first premiership victory was assured. Although Easts fought back with two late tries to John Ballesty and Bill Mullins and brought the score to 19–14, time ran out for the Roosters and Manly had won their first ever premiership in first grade.

In the end, it was Manly's part-time goal kicker Ray Branighan who proved the difference, kicking six goals from eight attempts.

 Manly-Warringah 19 (Tries: Fred Jones, Ray Branighan. Goals: Ray Branighan 6. Field Goal: Bob Fulton)

Eastern Suburbs 14 (Tries: John Ballesty, Bill Mullins. Goals: Allan McKean 4)

Man of the Match: Dennis Ward (Manly).

Referee: Keith Page

Attendance: 54,537

Player statistics
The following statistics are as of the conclusion of Round 22.

Top 5 point scorers

Top 5 try scorers

Top 5 goal scorers

References

External links
Rugby League Tables – Season 1972 The World of Rugby League
Results:1971-80 at rabbitohs.com.au
1972 J J Giltinan Shield and WD & HO Wills Cup at rleague.com
NSWRFL season 1972 at rugbyleagueproject.com

New South Wales Rugby League premiership
Nswrfl season